Margrave Aleksander Ignacy Jan-Kanty Wielopolski (born 1803 in Sędziejowice, Kraków Department,  Duchy of Warsaw, died 1877 in Dresden, Kingdom of Saxony, German Empire) was a Polish aristocrat, owner of large estates, and the 13th lord of the manor of Pinczów. In 1862 he was appointed head of Poland's Civil Administration within the Russian Empire under Tsar Alexander II.

Education and early career
Wielopolski was educated in Vienna, Warsaw, Paris and Göttingen. In 1830 he was elected a member of the Polish diet on the Conservative side. At the beginning of the November Uprising of 1831 he was sent to London to obtain the assistance, or at least the mediation, of England, but the only result of his mission was the publication of the pamphlet Mémoire présenté à Lord Palmerston (Warsaw, 1831). On the collapse of the insurrection he emigrated, and on his return to Poland devoted himself exclusively to literature and the cultivation of his estates.

On the occasion of the Galician outbreak of 1846, when the Galician peasantry massacred some hundreds of Polish landowners, an outbreak generally attributed to the machinations of the Austrian government, Wielopolski wrote his Lettre d'un gentilhomme polonais au prince de Metternich (Brussels, 1846), which caused a great sensation at the time, and in which he attempted to prove that the Austrian court was acting in collusion with the Russians in the affair.

National politics
In 1861, Wielopolski was appointed president of the commissions of public worship and justice and subsequently president of the council of state. A visit to the Russian capital in November still further established his influence, and in 1862 he was appointed adjutant to Grand Duke Konstantin, who had recently been appointed Polish viceroy.

Wielopolski was conservative, pro-Russian, a proponent of regaining Poland's pre-1830 autonomy, and a champion of the emancipation of Jews. He undertook educational reforms, increasing the number of Polish-language schools and establishing in Warsaw the "Main School" (today's University of Warsaw, the Royal University of Warsaw established in 1816 was closed after November Uprising). He also enacted banking system reforms and agricultural reform (rents instead of serfdom for peasants).

He felt that the Russian Empire's difficult internal and international situation would force the Tsarist administration to make certain concessions to the Polish nobility. On the other hand, the Polish nobility should – in his opinion – accept Tsarist rule and take part in the Empire's political life instead of calling for independence.

His project was based on decisions of 1815 when Tsar Alexander I signed a Constitution and made various promises to extend liberties to the parts of Poland incorporated into Russia (the "Taken Territories" ). Ultimately, Wielopolski gave up such ideas and proposed instead: formal condemnation of the November Uprising and acceptance of the Romanov dynasty's everlasting rule over Poland, expecting in turn from the Tsar the restoration of Polish liberties, a semi-independent government, curtailment of censorship, and the closure of Russian Military Courts. His proposal, unfortunately, was rejected, and the Tsar decided to make various limited concessions only when it was too late, and the streets of Warsaw were running with blood: "No constitution, no Polish Army, nothing like political autonomy; instead administrative freedoms with nominations for Poles, not excluding Russians".

Wielopolski knew that the Poles' fervent desire for independence was coming to a head, something he wanted to avoid at all costs. In an attempt to derail the Polish national movement, he organized the conscription of young Polish activists into the Russian Army (for 20-year service). That decision is what provoked the January Uprising of 1863, that is, the very outcome Wielopolski wished to avoid.

During the fiercest days of the Uprising Wielopolski asked for a 2-month leave of office. This was granted by the Russian Royal Prince in early July 1863, and on 16 July he left Warsaw heading north. Officially he traveled to the spa on the island of Rügen, but in fact he chose emigration, and left the country forever. He settled in Dresden (Saxony), where he died 14 years later. His body was, however, brought to his native Poland. He is buried in the crypt of the Holy Spirit church at Młodzawy Małe.

References

Further reading
 Zyzniewski, Stanley J. "The Russo-Polish Crucible of the 1860s: A Review of Some Recent Literature." The Polish Review (1966): 23–46. Online

External links

1803 births
1877 deaths
People from Kielce County
19th-century Polish nobility
Polish diplomats
Polish conservatives
Aleksander
Polish diplomats of November Uprising
Government officials of Congress Poland
Participants of the Slavic Congress in Prague 1848